51 Arietis is a star in the northern constellation of Aries. 51 Arietis is the Flamsteed designation. It is a dim, yellow-hued star – a challenge to view with the naked eye, having an apparent visual magnitude of 6.6. It is receding from the Earth with a heliocentric radial velocity of +9.5 km/s, and is a member of the IC 2391 moving group.

This is an ordinary G-type main sequence star with a stellar classification of G8 V. Similar to the Sun, it has 1.04 times the mass and 0.99 times the Sun's radius. It is 1.4 billion years old with a leisurely rotation rate, showing a projected rotational velocity of 4 km/s. The atmospheric metallicity is higher than solar. The star radiates 92% of the Sun's luminosity from its photosphere at an effective temperature of 5,666 K. This heat gives it the golden-hued glow of a G-type star.

References

External links
 sky-map.org/
 Image 51 Arietis

G-type main-sequence stars
Aries (constellation)
Durchmusterung objects
Arietis, 51
0120.2
018803
014150